The following is an episode list for the Israeli sitcom Ramzor.

Series overview

Season 1

Season 2

Season 3

Season 4

References

External links
 Official website 
 

Ramzor